Juan McPherson (born June 26, 1984) is a retired male boxer from the United States. He won a silver medal in the men's welterweight division at the 2003 Pan American Games, and earned the right to go to the 2004 Summer Olympics.

Instead Canada's Adam Trupish qualified for the Athens Games as a lucky semifinal loser in the second tournament in Tijuana, Mexico. He took the place of McPherson when his quota was dropped by the USA Boxing Association due to unsuccessful presentation at the USA Olympic trials. The winner of those trials, Vanes Martirosyan, qualified for the Qualifying Tournament in Tijuana.

McPherson made his professional debut on August 26, 2005 against Wilmer Torres.

External links
Profile

1984 births
Living people
Welterweight boxers
Boxers at the 2003 Pan American Games
American male boxers
Pan American Games silver medalists for the United States
Pan American Games medalists in boxing
Medalists at the 2003 Pan American Games